Later Liang may refer to the following states in Chinese history:

 Later Liang (Sixteen Kingdoms) (後涼; 386–403), one of the Sixteen Kingdoms
 Western Liang (555–587), also known as Later Liang (後梁), a state during the Southern and Northern Dynasties period
 Later Liang (Five Dynasties) (後梁; 907–923), a state during the Five Dynasties and Ten Kingdoms period

See also
 Emperor Taizu of Later Liang (disambiguation)
 Liang dynasty (disambiguation)
 Western Liang (disambiguation)
 Southern Liang (disambiguation)